Panmure is an east Auckland suburb, in the North Island of New Zealand. It is located 11 kilometres southeast of the Auckland CBD, close to the western banks of the Tāmaki River and the northern shore of the Panmure Basin (or Kaiahiku). To the north lies the suburb of Tāmaki, and to the west is the cone of Maungarei / Mount Wellington.

Demographics

Panmure West is mostly commercial and industrial. Panmure East is mostly residential.

Panmure had a population of 3,651 at the 2018 New Zealand census, an increase of 393 people (12.1%) since the 2013 census, and an increase of 732 people (25.1%) since the 2006 census. There were 1,257 households, comprising 1,839 males and 1,815 females, giving a sex ratio of 1.01 males per female, with 594 people (16.3%) aged under 15 years, 891 (24.4%) aged 15 to 29, 1,644 (45.0%) aged 30 to 64, and 525 (14.4%) aged 65 or older.

Ethnicities were 41.6% European/Pākehā, 14.1% Māori, 20.7% Pacific peoples, 35.0% Asian, and 3.4% other ethnicities. People may identify with more than one ethnicity.

The percentage of people born overseas was 45.9, compared with 27.1% nationally.

Although some people chose not to answer the census's question about religious affiliation, 35.5% had no religion, 44.0% were Christian, 1.8% had Māori religious beliefs, 4.8% were Hindu, 2.8% were Muslim, 3.0% were Buddhist and 2.5% had other religions.

Of those at least 15 years old, 840 (27.5%) people had a bachelor's or higher degree, and 450 (14.7%) people had no formal qualifications. 459 people (15.0%) earned over $70,000 compared to 17.2% nationally. The employment status of those at least 15 was that 1,629 (53.3%) people were employed full-time, 345 (11.3%) were part-time, and 144 (4.7%) were unemployed.

History

Māori history 
The Māori name for the area from Panmure south-west towards the Manukau Harbour area was Tauoma. Te Tō Waka and Karetu, two of the traditional portages between the Waitematā Harbour and the Manukau Harbour were near here. 4.6 km up the Tāmaki River Māori would beach their waka (canoes) at the end of a small creek (that now passes under the southern motorway) and drag them overland (where Portage Road is now) to the Manukau Harbour.

In the mid to late 18th century, land along the Western shores of the Tāmaki River were given as a tuku (strategic gift) by Te Tahuri, daughter of Te Horetā of the Ngāti Whātua Ōrākei hapū Ngā Oho, to the Hauraki Gulf iwi Ngāti Pāoa. Te Tahuri's sister Te Kehu had been married to Te Putu, an important figure within Ngāti Pāoa, for which Te Tahuri was derided and called foolish by people concerned by what the outcomes of such a tuku would cause. Ngāti Pāoa leader Tangi-te-ruru built Mauināina pā (also known as Maunga-inaina and Taumata-inaina) at the headland between the Panmure Basin and Tāmaki River, and along the Tāmaki River was an extensive kāinga (unfortified village) called Mokoia. In the late 18th century, war broke out between Ngāti Whātua and Ngāti Pāoa after a joint shark hunting trip, and both Te Tahuri and her husband Tomoaure were killed in the resulting skirmishes, with hostilities ending around the year 1793. By the time missionaries Samuel Marsden and John Gare Butler visited the isthmus in 1820, there were thousands of inhabitants living along the shores of the Tāmaki River at Mokoia.

During the Musket Wars in late September 1821, Mokoia and Mauināina pā were attacked by a Ngāpuhi taua led by Hongi Hika, Pōmare I (Ngati Manu) and Tuhi (Te Ngare Raumati of Pāroa), during a time when the Tāmaki isthmus was relatively unprotected, as many Ngāti Whātua warriors were touring the lower North Island on the Āmiowhenua war party expedition. Defenders of the pā placed stakes into the landing areas to slow the Ngāpuhi taua's progress, and over the course of two days, the taua was pelted with stones. When the pā was under siege, the taua found that the muskets were ineffective due to the defenders sheltering behind an earthen wall, so built a platform which overlooked the pā, and shot at those who were inside. The fighting devastated what had been the Ngāti Pāoa population centre of the Auckland isthmus during pre-European times which had a population of about 7,000. Three thousand men with up to 100 muskets took part in the defense of the pā but after a close and bitter battle were defeated by the combined northern alliance who had between 500 and 1000 muskets. Mokoia and Mauināina pā were destroyed, and the land became tapu for Ngāti Pāoa due to the large number of deaths, and was not resettled.

European history 

In 1841, the Government bought the Kohimaramara block from Ngāti Pāoa. In January 1842 Felton Mathew surveyed "Tehmaki" (sic.) into 37 farms totalling 3,856 acres. Part of this became the Fencible settlement of Panmure, between Maungarei and the Tāmaki River. In 1848, 80 Fencible families came here from Ireland and England on the ship Clifton and established a settlement with 99 raupo huts on the eastern shores of the lagoon. They called the area Maggotty Hollow. Located on the Tāmaki River, Panmure was favoured by Felton Mathew to be the new capital of New Zealand. William Hobson, however, decided otherwise, and the new town of Auckland arose further to the west along the shores of the Waitematā Harbour.

Panmure was then instead created as a fencible settlement, where retired soldiers were contracted to defend the settlement in return for land. The soldiers had to give 12 days military service per year and parade on Sunday in full military equipment. The only time they were called to arms was in 1851 when a flotilla of 20 waka took about 350 warriors to Mechanics Bay to attack Auckland. The Panmure fencibles were issued ammunition to defend the Tamaki River and stop any armed Maori attack. Only the Onehunga fencibles were marched to the hill over looking Mechanics Bay to join a British line regiment. In the 1863 attack on Auckland the government used mainly professional soldiers instead.

Panmure was an important town and port as it was strategically placed near the narrowest part of the isthmus, and during the New Zealand Wars of the 1860s it became a very busy place. In 1865 the Panmure Bridge opened, connecting the Auckland isthmus to eastern Auckland farmland and the fencible settlement at Howick. Even after the railway reached Auckland in 1908, Panmure somewhat continued as a transport hub – steamers from Auckland en route to the goldfields in the Coromandel and Firth of Thames would call in here. Panmure prospered partly due to being on the route between Auckland and the much larger fencibles settlement of Howick in the 1800s. People and goods used the ferry at the narrow point below Mokoia Pa.

Until about the middle of the 20th century, Panmure remained a prosperous but mostly pastoral setting, the smallest borough of Auckland, and described as "a quarter of a square mile of farmlets surrounding a sleepy village that boasted little more than a church, post office, a handful of shops, and a two-storey hotel that was widely known from horse and buggy days". Panmure Township merged with Mount Wellington Borough in 1955.

It was only with the explosive growth of suburbia around it after World War II, and better bridges to Pakuranga that Panmure relatively suddenly started to grow significantly, and become a commercial centre.

Recent developments 
Work was completed on the Panmure section (Stage 1) of the Auckland Transport project called AMETI (Auckland-Manukau Eastern Transport Initiative) which aims to improve the connections of eastern Auckland towards the south-east (Manukau central). As part of this, Panmure railway station underwent a major upgrade, increasing capacity and frequency of trains into the city (now a 17-minute travel time to Britomart station). The new Te Horeta Rd, the last major milestone, opened on 2 November 2015. Other related upgrades included the building of three new bridges, new cycle paths and foot paths.

Stage 2 of AMETI will see the completion of the 7 km Eastern Busway which will link Panmure railway station with Pakuranga and Botany. This is expected to cut public transport journey times significantly and relieve congestion on roads. The busway is expected to attract 5.5 million passengers a year. The Panmure Roundabout will become an intersection, a change that will see new investment in the redevelopment of the land adjacent to and north of the rail station.

The Tamaki Transformation Programme was announced in early 2012 by Housing Minister Phil Heatley. This will be the country's first urban regeneration programme. Heatley said that east Auckland was chosen because it was an area with "significant potential". "It is close to the Auckland and Manukau central business districts. It has a young population, a sense of history and community, green spaces and near-coastal location". Following this announcement, Auckland Council and the New Zealand government formed the Tamaki Redevelopment Company to deliver the Tamaki Transformation Programme with the aim of creating a "thriving, attractive, sustainable and self-reliant community through a series of interlinking and  economic, social, urban space and housing projects". Substantial Central and Local Government partnership investment into the Tamaki Regeneration Programme will see change over the next 25 years, aiming to improve the overall quality of life to the residents of Tamaki with an expected doubling of the population in this area.

Education

All these schools are coeducational. Rolls are as of

Notable buildings 

 St Matthias' Church (Anglican)

See also 
William Dwane Bell, who killed three people at the Panmure RSA in 2001.

References 

The Lively Capital, Auckland 1840-1865. Una Platts. Avon Fine Prints Limited New Zealand 1971.
 Bentley Trevor.Cannibal Jack.Penguin.2010..
Moon, Paul."This Savage Country"Penguin .2012.

External links 
Photographs of Panmure held in Auckland Libraries' heritage collections.

Suburbs of Auckland
Populated places on the Tāmaki River